Kermit's Swamp Years is a 2002 American direct-to-video comedy film directed by David Gumpel. It is the second direct-to-video feature film in The Muppets franchise. The film follows a young Kermit the Frog and his best friends, Goggles and Croaker, who travel outside their homes in the swamps of the Deep South to go on an adventure.

The film was released on VHS, DVD and on the Starz network on August 18, 2002. Although the film’s distribution rights are still owned by Sony Pictures rather than The Walt Disney Company, Kermit's Swamp Years was filmed at the Disney-MGM Studios, which is now known as Disney's Hollywood Studios and Naples, Florida.

Plot
Kermit the Frog rides a scooter down a dirt road on his way to visit the swamp where he grew up and reminisces about his first big adventure.

A twelve-year-old Kermit enjoys a serene amphibian's life with his cool and smooth-talking best friend, Croaker the Frog, who is the best hopper in the swamp, and Goggles the Toad, a shy and awkward friend of his. Kermit wonders what lies beyond the swamp, but his companions do not think the same. The friends run into Dr. Krassman and his assistant Mary (Kelly Collins Lintz), intent on capturing frogs. Arnie the Alligator saves them and warns them about the dangers lurking outside the swamp, especially regarding humans. The next day, they run into Blotch, a huge bullfrog, who bullies Goggles. The fight spills onto a road, where the pair are taken by a pet store owner named Wilson (William Bookston), prompting Kermit and Croaker to venture forth on a quest to save their friends.

When Goggles and Blotch are taken into a pet store, Blotch's bullying causes the pair to be put in a cage with Vicki the Snake, who intends to eat Blotch. Goggles saves him by goading Vicki to kill him and then using his poison gland. The other animals at the store manage to convince Goggles and Blotch in a lively musical number that being sold to someone as a pet leads to a safe and luxurious lifestyle.

After getting run over by Wilson's truck and having tire tracks on his chest, Croaker is no longer able to hop and starts to lose his confidence. Kermit and Croaker meet a stray dog named Pilgrim (voiced by Cree Summer), who saves them from Krassman and Mary, then decides to help them find their friends. Kermit is able to find Wilson's truck by using helium balloons, but discovers they are no longer in the vehicle. Kermit regroups with Pilgrim and Croaker again, and together they find Wilson's Pet Store. Croaker, filled with motivation, finally manages to hop again by hopping through the window and helps Kermit up the window, but they find out from Vicki that their friends have gone to George Washington High School, where animals never come back from. Kermit speaks to a star he often looked up at in the swamp, who gives him advice that he shouldn't give up hope, which reaffirms Kermit's determination to find Goggles and Blotch and he comes up with a clever plan for him and Croaker to break into George Washington High School, save Goggles and Blotch, and defeat Krassman for good.

The next day, Kermit and Croaker deliberately get caught by Wilson to get taken to the high school and escape upon arrival as the first step of Kermit's plan. They meet Pilgrim again, who followed them in order to save Goggles and Blotch as well. Pilgrim and Croaker, under Kermit's instructions, distract Wilson by asking them to capture them while Kermit to go to biology class and rescue Goggles, which is part of Kermit's plan. Kermit hitches a ride on a student's backpack. Krassman intends to dissect Goggles, but Blotch sacrifices himself to return the favor for rescuing him from Vicki. Krassman decides to dissect Croaker instead, when Wilson brings him into the class. Mary refuses to show the class how the dissection is done and leaves the classroom. Kermit manages to free Croaker from the dissection table and fight with Dr. Krassman using some swashbuckling techniques he picked up earlier at a movie theater, but Krassman is able to overpower Kermit, Croaker, and Blotch. Goggles finds the knife that Kermit dropped, but after he picks it up, Krassman sees him.

Despite the warnings that Kermit should never talk to humans, Kermit stops Krassman from attacking Goggles by talking and asks him to please release the frogs. This action leads Krassman to reveal that as a child, he was about to dissect his first frog when the frog begged him to stop, but the frog refused to say anything to everyone else in Krassman's classroom, which caused him to be humiliated. With the truth revealed that frogs can talk and Kermit's rescue plan as a success, Krassman frees all the frogs, dismisses the class and enables Kermit and his friends to return home. After a ride back to the swamp's border in Wilson's truck, Wilson adopts Pilgrim and the four friends head back home, where Kermit is hailed a hero for saving Goggles and Blotch and redeeming Krassman.

Back in the present, Kermit thinks about how all of them have remained friends over the years before finally arriving at the border and reunites with his friends and family.

Cast

Live-action cast
 William Bookston as Wilson
 John Hostetter as Dr. Hugo Krassman
 Hampton Dixon as Young Hugo Krassman
 Christian Kebbel as Young Jim Henson
 Kelly Collins Lintz as Mary
 Drew Haggard as Joey
 Lauren Leech as Ms. Segland, Student #1
 Cree Summer as Pilgrim (voice) / Kermit the Frog's Mom (voice)
 Joe Schofield as Dog Catcher (uncredited)

Muppet performers and voice cast
 Steve Whitmire as Kermit the Frog / Jack / Chico the Frog
 Joseph Mazzarino as Goggles / Turtle #1 / Pearl the Pika
 Bill Barretta as Croaker / Horace D'Fly / Roy the Frog / Turtle #2 / Dog
 Alice Dinnean as Vicki / Kermit the Frog's Mom (puppeteer) / Pilgrim (puppeteer) / Ernie
 John Kennedy as Arnie the Alligator / Blotch / Monkey
 Dave Goelz as Young Waldorf
 Jerry Nelson as Young Statler

Production notes
Goggles and Croaker were performed by Joseph Mazzarino and Bill Barretta, respectively. Mazzarino was a writer, lyricist, and puppeteer for Sesame Street at the time of the film's production. Mazzarino also co-wrote the teleplay for the film. Blotch was performed by John Kennedy.

Originally, Barretta was going to play Goggles and Mazzarino was going to play Croaker, but they traded roles after they tried out the characters.

The opening and closing sequences also introduce Horace D'Fly (voiced by Barretta), one of the few computer-generated (CG) Muppets (in the outtakes reel at the end of the film, Horace complains about having to be inside Kermit's mouth and asks, "Can't we use CG or something?").

The character Pilgrim was depicted in some scenes using a real dog, and other scenes as a puppet that was identical to the live dog.

The film's outtakes reel includes an alternate version of the song "The Rainbow Connection" performed by Me First and the Gimme Gimmes.

The behind-the-scenes featurette on the DVD is hosted by a Muppet named Joe the Armadillo (performed by Mazzarino) interviewing various members of the production staff and crew.

References

External links

 
 Kermit's Swamp Years at Internet Movie Database

2002 films
2000s fantasy comedy films
2002 television films
American fantasy comedy films
Films set in Florida
Films set in Mississippi
Films shot in Florida
The Muppets films
The Jim Henson Company films
Sony Pictures direct-to-video films
Swamp Years
Animal rights mass media
Television prequel films
2002 directorial debut films
2002 comedy films
2000s English-language films
2000s American films
American prequel films